Bearwallow is an unincorporated crossroads village in Washington County, Kentucky, United States.  It lies at the intersection of roads from Bardstown, Cisselville, Fredericktown, Manton, and McIntyre.

The name comes from a small depression where bears came to wallow in a mud hole.

References

 Compiled by the Washington County Bicentennial Book Committee. Washington County, Kentucky Bicentennial History, 1792-1992.  Turner Publishing Company, 1991. 

Unincorporated communities in Washington County, Kentucky
Unincorporated communities in Kentucky